Beshik-Jon is a village in Jalal-Abad Region of Kyrgyzstan. It is part of the Bazar-Korgon District. Its population was 5,342 in 2021.

Population

References

Populated places in Jalal-Abad Region